Pseudopterosin E is an anti-inflammatory isolate from the Caribbean coral Pseudopterogorgia elisabethae.

Notes
Pharmacological characterization of the pseudopterosins: novel anti-inflammatory natural products isolated from the Caribbean soft coral, Pseudopterogorgia elisabethae

Anti-inflammatory agents
Tricyclic compounds